John Montgomery Glover (September 4, 1822 – November 15, 1891) was a  North American politician, who served as a U.S. Representative from Missouri, he was the uncle of John Milton Glover.

Early life
Born in Harrodsburg, Kentucky, Glover attended the public schools in Kentucky.
He moved to Missouri in 1836 with his parents, who settled in Knox County, near Newark, and continued his schooling.
He attended Marion and Masonic Colleges, Philadelphia, Missouri.
He studied law.
He was admitted to the bar and commenced practice in St. Louis, Missouri.
He moved to California in 1850 and continued the practice of his profession.
He returned to Knox County, Missouri, in 1855 to take charge of his father's affairs.

Career
During the Civil War served as colonel of the Third Regiment, Missouri Volunteer Cavalry, beginning September 4, 1861.  His service with the regiment was in a variety of points within Missouri and Arkansas.  At various points during his service, he detached as the Commander of the District of Rolla, the Sub-District of Pilot Knob and the 2nd Brigade, Cavalry Division, Department of the Missouri.  On February 23, 1864 he tendered his resignation in Springfield, Illinois, on account of impaired health.

He served as collector of internal revenue for the third district of Missouri from December 1, 1866, until March 3, 1867.

Glover was elected as a Democrat to the Forty-third, Forty-fourth, and Forty-fifth Congresses (March 4, 1873 – March 3, 1879).
He served as chairman of the Committee on Expenditures in the Department of the Treasury (Forty-fifth Congress).
He was an unsuccessful candidate for renomination in 1878.
He engaged in agricultural pursuits.
He died near Newark, Missouri, November 15, 1891.
He was interred on his farm near Newark, Missouri.
He was reinterred in Woodland Cemetery, Quincy, Illinois.

References

1822 births
1891 deaths
Union Army colonels
Democratic Party members of the United States House of Representatives from Missouri
19th-century American politicians